Heinz Weisenbach (30 August 1945 - 9 December 2018) was a German ice hockey player and coach. He competed in the men's tournament at the 1968 Winter Olympics.

References

External links
 

1945 births
2018 deaths
German ice hockey players
Ice hockey players at the 1968 Winter Olympics
Olympic ice hockey players of West Germany
Sportspeople from Füssen